Cartersburg is an unincorporated community in Liberty Township, Hendricks County, Indiana.

History
Cartersburg had its start in the year 1850 by the building of the railroad through that territory. It was named for its founder, John Carter. Cartersburg contained a post office from 1852 until 1992.

Geography
It has a community church. Cartersburg also has a small children's playground.

The Cartersburg Springs (also known as the Magnetic Springs) were located near the town; however, water no longer flows at the site.

References

Unincorporated communities in Hendricks County, Indiana
Unincorporated communities in Indiana
Indianapolis metropolitan area